St. Mary's Academy (SMA) is a Catholic high school for girls in Inglewood, California, at the intersection of Prairie Avenue and Grace Avenue.

Background
St. Mary's was established in 1889 by the Sisters of Saint Joseph of Carondelet.

References

External links

 St. Mary's Academy Official Website

Roman Catholic secondary schools in Los Angeles County, California
Girls' schools in California
Educational institutions established in 1889
Schools in Inglewood, California
Catholic secondary schools in California
1889 establishments in California